Prestwould is a historic house near Clarksville, Virginia. It is the most intact and best documented plantation surviving in Southside Virginia. The house was built by Sir Peyton Skipwith, 7th Baronet Skipwith, who moved his family from his Elm Hill Plantation to Prestwould in 1797. It was declared a National Historic Landmark in 2003. Now a museum property, it is open for tours from April to October, or by appointment.

Description and history

Prestwould Plantation today consists of almost  on the north side of the Roanoke River. Its main house is situated on a hill overlooking the upper reaches of John H. Kerr Reservoir, a result of damming the river in the 1950s.  The plantation complex includes eight buildings, all built before 1830 and most dating to the 1780s.  The house is a handsome stone building with a hip roof and a pair of interior chimneys.  The main facade is symmetrical, with seven bays.  The center three bays of the first floor are sheltered by a gabled porch, supported by Doric columns.  Similar porches are found on two other sides of the building.  The secondary buildings of the complex are all wood-frame structures, and include an office, plantation store, slave quarters, and a pair of smokehouses.

See also
List of National Historic Landmarks in Virginia
National Register of Historic Places listings in Mecklenburg County, Virginia

References

External links
Prestwould, the house and touring information
Prestwould, Mecklenburg County, one photo at Virginia DHR
Prestwould Plantation, U.S. Route 15 vicinity, Clarksville vicinity, Mecklenburg County, VA: 4 photos, 23 drawings, 2 data pages, at Historic American Buildings Survey
Prestwould family cemetery on Find a Grave

Houses on the National Register of Historic Places in Virginia
Historic American Buildings Survey in Virginia
National Historic Landmarks in Virginia
Museums in Mecklenburg County, Virginia
Historic house museums in Virginia
Houses completed in 1795
Plantation houses in Virginia
Georgian architecture in Virginia
Houses in Mecklenburg County, Virginia
National Register of Historic Places in Mecklenburg County, Virginia
Slave cabins and quarters in the United States